Fort Hamilton High School (HS 490) is a public high school in Brooklyn, New York, USA, under the jurisdiction of the New York City Department of Education. Students in Bay Ridge, Sunset Park and Dyker Heights are zoned to Fort Hamilton HS. It is named for the army garrison at Fort Hamilton.

Ground was broken by then mayor Fiorello LaGuardia on September 23, 1940 and the school opened at 8301 Shore Road on September 8, 1941 at the location of the former Crescent Athletic Country Club.

Notable alumni

 Stephen Antonakos  (1926–2013), sculptor known for his abstract sculptures and for being a pioneer in the use of neon in art.
 James Fyfe (1942–2005), criminologist and former professor of criminal justice at the John Jay College of Criminal Justice, Temple University, and American University
 Vincent J. Gentile (born 1959, class of 1977), former New York City Councilman and former State Senator
 Jephté Guillaume, multi-instrumentalist, DJ and producer
 Paul Jabara (1948–1992), actor and Academy Award-winning songwriter
 Letitia James (born 1958), lawyer and politician, current Attorney General of New York and former City Public Advocate; the first African-American and second woman to hold each of those posts.
 Jaiquawn Jarrett (born 1989), former NFL safety for the New York Jets.
 Bruce Johannesson (born 1962), lead guitarist for the rock band Poison under the stage name 'C.C. DeVille'
 Albert King (born 1959), retired NBA player.
 Bernard King (born 1956), retired NBA All-star
 Frank Layden (born 1932), former coach and executive of the NBA's Utah Jazz
 Julio Lugo (1975-2021), former Major League baseball player
 Christopher J. Mega (1930–2011), lawyer and politician, former New York Supreme Court Justice, former State Senator, and former State Assemblyman.
 Danny Nee (born 1945), longtime basketball head coach at USMMA, Duquesne University, University of Nebraska-Lincoln, and Ohio University.
 Lana Parrilla (born 1977), actress best known for Once Upon a Time
 George Preti (1944–2020), analytical organic chemist whose research focused on the nature, origin, and functional significance of human odors.
 Fred Samara (born 1950), former athlete who competed in the men's decathlon at the 1976 Summer Olympics.
 Neil M. Stevenson (1930–2009), rear admiral, former Chief of U.S. Navy Chaplains
 Janet Yellen (born 1946, class of 1963), economist, current U.S. Secretary of the Treasury and former Chair of the Federal Reserve (2014-2018); the first woman to hold either post.

References

External links

Public high schools in Brooklyn
1941 establishments in New York City
Educational institutions established in 1941